Benmar Sabalan (also Romanized as Benmār-e Sabalān; also known as Bīnamār-e Sabalān and Benmār) is a village in the Sabalan District of Sareyn County, Ardabil Province, Iran. At the 2006 census, its population was 483 in 104 families.

References 

Tageo

Towns and villages in Sareyn County